Noyalo is a former commune in the Morbihan department of Brittany in north-western France. On 1 January 2016, it was merged into the new commune Theix-Noyalo. Its population was 911 in 2019. Inhabitants of Noyalo are called in French Noyalais.

See also
Communes of the Morbihan department

References

External links

Former communes of Morbihan